The 1968 Oklahoma Sooners football team represented the University of Oklahoma during the 1968 NCAA University Division football season. They played their home games at Oklahoma Memorial Stadium and competed as members of the Big Eight Conference. They were coached by head coach Chuck Fairbanks.

Although Oklahoma shared the Big Eight championship with Kansas and defeated the Jayhawks 27–23 on their home field, the Sooners were passed over by the Orange Bowl, which invited 9–1 Kansas.

Schedule

Roster

Rankings

Postseason

NFL/AFL draft
Eddie Hinton was drafted into the National Football League following the season.

References

Oklahoma Sooners
Oklahoma Sooners football seasons
Big Eight Conference football champion seasons
Oklahoma Sooners football